Governor Simpson may refer to:

Edward Simpson (governor) (1860–1930), Acting 20th Naval Governor of Guam in 1916
George Simpson (HBC administrator) (c. 1792–1860), Governor of Rupert's Land from 1821 to 1861
Lyndell Simpson (fl. 2010s), Acting Governor of Montserrat in 2018
Milward Simpson (1897–1993), 23rd Governor of Wyoming
Oramel H. Simpson (1870–1932), 39th Governor of Louisiana
William Dunlap Simpson (1823–1890), 78th Governor of South Carolina